John Edward Morton  (18 July 1923 – 6 March 2011) was a biologist, scholar, theologian, and conservationist from New Zealand. Trained at Auckland University College and the University of London, he became the author of numerous books, papers, and newspaper columns. Morton researched New Zealand's ecology and marine life, and was a marine zoologist. He was also the presenter of the imported nature and science television programme, Our World.

Early life
Born in Morrinsville on 18 July 1923, Morton was the son of Ronald Bampton Morton. He was educated at Morrinsville District High School, and went on to study zoology at Auckland University College, graduating with the degree of MSc with first-class honours in 1948. In 1952 he completed his PhD, followed in 1959 by a DSc, at the University of London. During this time he was also a lecturer in the zoology department at the same university.

Career
On his return from London in the early 1960s, he became the first person to be appointed to the chair of the School of Zoology and Biological Sciences at the University of Auckland, a position he held from 1959 to 1988. He was considered at this time one of New Zealand's most talented up-and-coming academics, and was later regarded by many as one of New Zealand's greatest marine biologists.

His teaching style and influence have been well-documented in A History of Biology at Auckland University 1883–1983. He believed in "humanising" complex scientific issues, and presenting them in laymen's language.

Morton was also regarded as one of New Zealand's leading Christian academics and believed in a unified view of science and religion. He told The New Zealand Herald upon his retirement in 1988 that "I find that my scientific work has confirmed my Christian convictions. To me biology and theology complement each other." In his 1984 book Redeeming Creation he acknowledged the influence of the French palaeontologist Teilhard de Chardin in forming the teleological view he expounded in his academic life.

Morton did much for conservation in New Zealand. In 1975, he was a leader in the establishment of New Zealand's first marine reserve, Cape Rodney-Okakari Point Marine Reserve (which is near Cape Rodney and Leigh and includes Te Hāwere-a-Maki / Goat Island). He led the conservation movement to a series of victories in the 1970s and 1980s, which saved the last of New Zealand's mainland native forests, Pureora, Whirinaki, Waitututu and South Westland from logging.

He served on the Auckland Regional Authority from 1971 to 1974 for Takapuna, losing his re-election bid after switching his party affiliation to Labour. In 1989 he became a founding member of the New Labour Party, which in 1991 formed a coalition with other parties called the Alliance.

Morton died at his home in Auckland on 6 March 2011.

Honours and awards
 Fellow of the Royal Society of New Zealand (1969)
 Honorary Fellow of Linnean Society of London (HonFLS)
 Companion of the Queen's Service Order for public services in the 1986 Queen's Birthday Honours
 Winner of Wattie Book of the Year 1968, for The New Zealand sea shore, together with Michael C. Miller
In 1965, malacologist Winston Ponder named the gastropod species Eatoniella mortoni after Morton.

Selected bibliography
Seashore ecology of New Zealand and the Pacific. John Edward Morton, Bruce William Hayward. Bateman, 2004. , .
The shore ecology of Upolu – Western Samoa. Issue 31 of Leigh Lab. bulletin. John Edward Morton, Andrew Jeffs, Leigh Marine Laboratory. University of Auckland, 1993.
Shore life between Fundy tides. John Edward Morton, J. C. Roff, Mary Beverley-Burton.	Canadian Scholars Press, 1991.
The shore ecology of the tropical Pacific. John Edward Morton. Unesco Regional Office for Science and Technology for South-East Asia, 1990.
Christ, creation, and the environment. John Edward Morton. Anglican Communications, 1989. , .
Marine molluscs: Opisthobranchia, Part 2. Richard Carden Willan, John Edward Morton, John Walsby, Leigh Marine Laboratory, University of Auckland, 1984.
The sea shore ecology of Hong Kong. Brian Morton, John Edward Morton. The University of Hong Kong, 1983. .
Marine molluscs: Amphineura, archaeogastropoda & pulmonata, Part 1. Issue 4 of Leigh Lab. bulletin. John Walsby, John Edward Morton, Leigh Marine Laboratory, University of Auckland, 1982.
Molluscs. John Edward Morton. Hutchinson University Library, 1979.
Seacoast in the seventies: the future of the New Zealand shoreline.	John Edward Morton, David A. Thom, Ronald Harry Locker. Hodder and Stoughton, 1973.
Man, science and God. John Edward Morton. Collins, 1972.
The New Zealand sea shore. John Edward Morton, Michael C. Miller. Collins, 1968.

References

1923 births
2011 deaths
Alliance (New Zealand political party) politicians
Alumni of the University of London
Auckland regional councillors
New Zealand Christian writers
Companions of the Queen's Service Order
Fellows of the Linnean Society of London
Fellows of the Royal Society of New Zealand
Marine zoologists
NewLabour Party (New Zealand) politicians
New Zealand biologists
New Zealand Labour Party politicians
Theistic evolutionists
University of Auckland alumni
Academic staff of the University of Auckland
Writers about religion and science
People from Morrinsville
People educated at Morrinsville College